is a 1952 black-and-white Japanese film directed by Masahiro Makino.

Cast 
 Ureo Egawa as Shōgo Yamamura
 Yuriko Hanabusa as Natsuno Sōma
 Chōko Iida as Kikuyo
 Michiyo Kogure as Michiko Sōma
 Noriko Munakata as Tsuruko Miyawakita
 Shin Saburi as Daisuke Sakuma
 Tatsuo Saitō as Hanzō Sakai
 Haruko Shima as Sadako Kitazawa
 Kyōji Sugi as Masanao Sōma
 Haruo Tanaka as Fumio Sōma
 Jun Tazaki as Kensaku - Tazaki
 Misako Yoshimura as Toshiko Yamamura

References

External links 
 http://pimo.txt-nifty.com/blog/2009/01/rikon-1952-7b09.html
 

Japanese black-and-white films
1952 films
Films directed by Masahiro Makino
1950s Japanese films